is a four lane avenue which forms the border between Mita 2-chōme and Shiba 5-chōme in Minato, Tokyo, Japan. Formerly occupied by a shopping center, a large number of office buildings and condominiums are now found there. Tokyo Tower is a northern extension of Mita-dori, and it can be seen from anywhere along Mita Dōri. Mita Library, the Mita Police Station, and Fushimi Sanpō Inari Shrine are found along the east side.

Secondary roads

Keio Nakadori Shoutengai
Keio Nakadori Shoutengai is a commercial avenue exist in Shiba 5-chome in the Minato ward. There are many shops between Mita-dori and Tamachi station; its width is about 3 meters.

Gallery

Minato, Tokyo
Transport in Tokyo
Streets in Tokyo

References